Point of Grace is the debut album by the contemporary Christian music group of the same name. It was released in 1993 by Word Records.

In 2000, the album was remastered and reissued with new artwork.

Background, release, and legacy
The album produced six #1 singles on Billboards Christian songs chart, making the group the first to achieve such a run with their debut album. One music video was filmed, for "Jesus Will Still Be There."

The group's debut single, "I'll Be Believing," was the only programmed song on the album. John Mays, then the group's A&R representative at Word Records, originally thought it would be best if it were buried in the tracklist. When the song was later performed live in 1996 on The Message About Life, Love & Other Mysteries Tour, an entirely new sequence was designed by Michael Hodge and Mark Childers. Hodge appears in the group's video for a later song, "Circle of Friends," which was recorded on that tour. Since Heather Payne's departure from the group in 2008, the song has been performed as a medley with "You Are the Answer" from the album Life, Love & Other Mysteries.

The group was initially reluctant to record "Faith, Hope & Love," but were convinced by Mays, owing to their appreciation of R&B acts such as En Vogue. Vocals on the song were arranged by Mervyn Warren of Take 6.

"No More Pain" included a choir consisting of the group's family and friends, including Denise Jones' husband, Stu.

Although "This Day" was not released as a single, it has remained a favorite among both the group and their fans, with Shelley Breen later speculating that "it [had] sold more sheet music and accompaniment tracks than anything else on the [album]."

Track listing

 Personnel Point of Grace Shelley Breen – vocals
 Denise Jones – vocals
 Terry Jones – vocals
 Heather Payne – vocalsMusicians Joe Hogue – keyboards
 Cheryl Rogers – keyboards
 Blair Masters – keyboard and bass programming (1)
 Jerry McPherson – guitars
 Jackie Street – bass guitar (2, 4, 5, 8, 9, 11)
 Scott Williamson – drums (1, 2, 4, 5, 6, 8-11), rhythm arrangements (all tracks), vocal arrangements (1-6, 8-11), keyboard programming (3, 6, 7, 10), drum programming (3, 7), bass programming (6, 10)
 Todd Collins – drum programming (3)
 Eric Darken – percussion
 Mark Douthit – saxophones (1, 8)
 Barry Green – trombone (1, 8)
 Mike Haynes – trumpet (1, 8)
 George Tidwell – trumpet (1, 8)
 Chris McDonald – horn arrangements (1, 8)
 Robert Sterling – rhythm arrangements (all tracks), vocal arrangements (1-6, 8-11)
 Mervyn Warren – vocal arrangements (7)Friends and Family All-Volunteer Choir on "No More Pain"'
 Jessica Atterberry, Cindy Bean, Frank Breeden, Frank Calderone, Shawn Cartwright, Travis Cottrell, Paul Cox, Christy Coxe, Ingrid DuMosch, Vicki Dvoracek, Kelly Garner, Steve Gatlin, Pamela Henderson, Chris Hogue, Ken Johnson, Suzie Johnson, Stu Jones, Tammi Lawson, Dianne Mays, H.L. McConnell, Larry McCoy, Cindy Morgan, David Mullen, Nicole C. Mullen, Alan Murdock, Patty O'Dells, Kelly Pody, Shawn Pody, Tami Pryce, Chance Scoggins, Joe Shell, Vicki Shell, Jeff Slaughter, Steve Smith, Lisa Springer, Cindy Sterling, Robert Sterling, Jennifer Teague, Audrey Teeter, Renee Thornton, Jerry Weimer, Aimee Joy Williamson and Kara Williamson.

Production 
 Producers – Robert Sterling and Scott Williamson 
 Executive Producer – John Mays
 Recorded by John Jaszcz, Wayne Morgan, Doug Sarrett and Scott Williamson.
 Assistant Engineers – Barry Campbell and Wayne Morgan
 Recorded at Recording Arts and Quad Studios (Nashville, TN).
 Mixed by John Jaszcz at Recording Arts 
 Mastered by Hank Williams at MasterMix (Nashville, TN).
 Art Direction – Diana Barnes
 Design – Franke Design Co.
 Photography – Matthew Barnes
 Design (Reissue) – Chuck Hargett
 Photography (Reissue) – Louise O'Brien and Daniel Scridde

References

1993 debut albums
Point of Grace albums